The 1954 Challenge Cup was the 53rd staging of rugby league's oldest knockout competition, the Challenge Cup. It featured clubs from the 1953–54 Northern Rugby Football League season and is particularly notable for its final, which had to be replayed at Odsal after a drawn match at Wembley, with the replay attracting possibly the largest ever crowd in world rugby league history.

First round

Second round

Quarterfinals

Semifinals

Final
Halifax and Warrington, the teams who had finished first and second respectively on the Championship ladder (separated by only one competition point), reached the Challenge Cup final Saturday 24 April 1954. The game was played at Wembley, and 81,841 spectators saw what turned out to be a comparatively lacklustre match. 

After a couple of penalties, Halifax held a 4-0 lead at half time. In the second half Warrington drew level, also kicking two penalties. There was no further scoring and the match finished in a draw, at 4 - 4. This match remains the only occasion on which Wembley hasn't seen a single try scored on Cup final day. The replay was initially scheduled for 5pm on Wednesday 5 May 1954 at Odsal Stadium, Bradford.

Final replay

Around 70,000 spectators were expected at Odsal for the replay, which was rescheduled for a 7pm kick-off in order to allow for rush hour traffic in Bradford. The twenty trains and fifty buses (specially arranged for the match, as well as the 100 gatesmen and 150 policemen on duty at the ground) were believed to be adequate to deal with the expected crowd. 

However, the competitive closeness with which the two teams were matched, together with the enticing prospect of the Challenge Cup decider coming north for the first time in a decade, seems to have generated far greater public interest than was supposed.

People had started queuing outside the stadium a good hour before the shuttle buses started running from 4:25pm. The gates opened at 5.00pm, and by that time some people had already been queuing for an hour and a half. With over an hour remaining before kick off, there were already an estimated 60,000 in the ground. The traffic on the roads in the surrounding area was at a standstill as more and more spectators converged on the stadium. Some squatted around the pitch, while others climbed onto rooftops for a better view. Fences around the ground had collapsed, as more people struggled to cram into the bowl of Odsal before the match started. 

The official attendance figure for the crowd was announced as 102,575  however it is widely believed that a more realistic figure for the number of spectators present is closer to 120,000.

The match itself was another tense, low-scoring struggle, but an improvement on the first game. Jim Challinor opened the scoring with a try for Warrington after nine minutes. Half an hour later, Tyssul Griffiths kicked a penalty for the Halifax side, who had also had two tries disallowed. This meant a half time score of 3 - 2 in favour of Warrington.

The third quarter of the match saw additional goals kicked by both Griffiths and Harry Bath, bringing the score to 5 - 4, still just one point in favour of Warrington. Then Gerry Helme scored a try, which Bath couldn't convert, putting Warrington four points clear of Halifax, but still within a converted try. Controversy reared just before full-time, when Halifax had a third try disallowed by referee Ron Gelder. Warrington had claimed their 4th Challenge Cup, with Helme winning the Lance Todd Trophy for his match-winning performance, the first player to do so twice.

References

Challenge Cup
Challenge Cup